Troy Ugle (born 18 April 1968) is a former Australian rules footballer.

Playing career
Ugle began his senior football career with Carey Park in the South West Football League.

In 1986 he joined Swan Districts in the West Australian Football League, making his debut the following year. He won the Swan Medal for best and fairest player at the club in 1987.

During the 1986/1987 Northern Territory Football League season Ugle played for Wanderers.

He was signed to the West Coast Eagles in 1988. He played 43 matches for the Eagles, kicking over 40 goals.

After being released by the Eagles Ugle returned to Swan Districts, playing a further 73 matches over five years and was leading goalkicker for the Swans between 1996 and 1998.

He was made a life member of the club by Swan Districts in 1999.

References

External links

1968 births
West Coast Eagles players
Swan Districts Football Club players
Wanderers Football Club players
Indigenous Australian players of Australian rules football
Living people
Australian rules footballers from Western Australia
Carey Park Football Club players
People from Bunbury, Western Australia